Lug (Derventa) is a suburb in the municipality of Derventa, Bosnia and Herzegovina.

References

Populated places in Derventa